Ice Cream Man is a comic series that premiered in 2018 from Image Comics.

Premise
The series is a horror anthology of loosely connected stories that all share the common link of a mysterious ice cream man named Rick (revealed to be Riccardus) who while a seemingly ordinary Ice Cream Man possesses inexplicable powers which he uses upon unsuspecting people. Rick's nemesis Caleb, a man dressed in an all black cowboy outfit, will sporadically appear in the series trying to thwart Rick's plans sometimes successfully and sometimes unsuccessfully.

Reception
Since its debut the series has received positive reviews. On the review aggregator, Comic Book Roundup, the series averaged a rating of 8.5 out of 10 based on a sample of 150 critics.

Adaptation
In October 2018, it was announced an adaptation of the series was in development at Universal Cable Productions. In February 2020, it was announced the series had been picked up by mobile streaming platform Quibi. With Quibi's shut down in December 2020, the fate of the series was mostly undetermined. However, in January of 2021 W. Maxwell Prince mentioned that the series is still in production.

References

2018 comics debuts
Image Comics titles
Horror anthology films